General Imaging was a manufacturer of digital cameras headquartered in Torrance, California, established in 2006 by Hiroshi "Hugh" Komiya, a former executive of Olympus Corporation. General Imaging sold their cameras internationally under the General Electric name, used under license. General Imaging was licensed to manufacture and sell their cameras under the AgfaPhoto name in Japan. On October 5, 2015General Imaging filed for bankruptcy.

Products

A Series 
The entry-level GE-branded digital cameras are designed for first-time buyers and those upgrading from first-generation digital cameras. Models in this series are powered by two AA alkaline batteries.

A730 

The A730 is an inexpensive point-and-shoot GE-branded 7 megapixel camera. It has a 3X optical zoom and a 4.5X digital zoom. The screen is a LTPS TFT, 153,600 pixel, 2.5 inch, color LCD. ISO Sensitivity is Auto, ISO 80/100/200/400/800/1600. Internal memory is 26MB.  A SD/SDHC slot supports up to a 4GB memory card. Power is by two AA batteries, alkaline or NiMH recommended.

A830 
The A830 is a point-and-shoot 8 megapixel camera that has the same zoom capabilities and other features of the A730.

A1230 
The A1230 is a quality 12.1 megapixel camera with an all-glass, 3X optical zoom lens. 4.5X digital zoom is also provided for a total available zoom of 13.5x. The camera has electronic image stabilization, face detection, smile detection, blink detection, and red-eye removal. A mode dial selects Auto, Manual, Panorama, Portrait, Scene, Image Stabilization, Movie, or Playback mode. The navigation dial doubles as exposure compensation, macro mode, 2/10 sec timer, and flash control buttons. A mini USB port on the side of the camera provides easy downloading of image files via provided cable to a computer which recognizes the A1230 as a removable drive. The screen is a LTPS TFT, 153,600 pixel, 2.5 inch, color LCD. ISO sensitivity is Auto, ISO 64/80/100/200/400/800/1600/3200(3M). Internal memory is 24MB. A SD/SDHC slot supports up to an 8GB memory card. Power is by two AA batteries, alkaline or NiMH recommended. Unfortunately, the camera's firmware lacks a battery type selection setting option to obtain optimum use from NiMH batteries. Known firmware versions are 1.01 D7 and 1.10 D7. The latter version has paginated menus whereas the early version has scrolling menus.

E Series 
The intermediate level of the GE-branded camera models, the E series features larger screens and is powered by rechargeable lithium-ion batteries. Memory can be expanded up to 4 gigabytes with SD or SDHC memory cards.

E850 

The E850 includes a 28mm equivalent wide-angle lens, a 5X optical zoom and 8 megapixels. The wide-angle lens is useful for large indoor group photos. It has a 5X optical zoom and the 4.5X digital zoom. The camera comes with a 3-inch LCD screen. It also can delete unwanted sections of a photo

E1030 
The E1030 has 10 megapixels, a 3X optical zoom and 4.5X digital zoom, which combine for a maximum zoom of 13.5X. The LCD screen is 2.7 inches.

E1040 

The E1040 includes 4X optical zoom, 4.5X digital zoom; and 10 megapixels. 3-inch LCD screen.

E1240 
The E1240 features 12 megapixels. A 4X optical zoom and a 4.5X digital zoom combine to create a maximum zoom of 18X; 3-inch LCD screen.

G Series

G1 

The G1 is the most compact model (3⅝ inches wide and 2½ inches high) in the GE-branded line. It includes a 3X optical zoom, a 2.5-inch LCD screen, 7 megapixels. Comes with a rechargeable lithium-ion battery and an SD/SDHC memory card slot, expandable up to 4 gigabytes.

G100 

The G100 is a modified bridge camera featuring an advanced Aptina™ A-Pix™ CMOS 14.4 megapixel pixel sensor and an all-glass, 15x optical zoom lens for exceptional photo clarity. 6X digital zoom is also provided for a total maximum zoom of 90X. It has a 3-inch, 460K pixel, color LCD display. The movie mode offers 1080p30, 720p60, 720p30, VGA, and QVGA Video. Internal memory is 15MB. A SD/SDHC/SDXC slot supports up to a 128GB memory card. The camera is powered by a 3.7V, 880mAh, GB-50A, rechargeable Lithium-ion battery with in-camera charging.

Waterproof series

G3WP 

The first camera in GE's waterproof series was the G3WP, a compact camera with capability for up to 3 meters (10 feet) underwater, 12.2 megapixel CCD sensor, "All-Glass" 4X optical zoom f/3.5-5.15 lens, and VGA Video.

G5WP 

Underwater capability 5 meters (16 feet), 12.2 megapixel CCD sensor, "All-Glass" 4X optical zoom f/3.5-5.15 lens.

Bridge Cameras

X1 
GE X1 is the first camera from General Imaging for the more serious photographer. It has a 12X optical zoom, a 2.5-inch LCD screen, 8 megapixels, and a handgrip. Paired with the camera's 12X optical zoom is a 4.5X digital zoom. Together, they give the X1 a maximum zoom of 54X. It also includes a 4-gigabyte SD/SDHC expansion slot.

X5
GE X5 is the lowest priced Bridge camera (dSLR like camera with fixed lens) on the market. On January 4, 2011, the price of Bridge cameras ranged from $129.47 (GE X5: 14 MP CCD sensor, 15x optical zoom) up to $339.95 (Fujifilm FinePix HS10: 10.3 MP CMOS sensor, 30x optical zoom), whereas Canon PowerShot SX30 IS: 14.1 MP CCD sensor, 35x optical zoom was $369.00 and Panasonic Lumix DMC-FZ100: 14.1 MP CMOS sensor, 24x optical zoom was only $375.00 (four months before it was $499.00). So, the highest price was almost 3.0x the cheapest price.

X500 
GE Power Pro X500 is the successor of GE X5. The camera has a 16-megapixel sensor and an electronic viewfinder, whereas the optical zoom and other features are relatively still the same as the predecessor.

On March 15, 2011 the price of Bridge cameras varied from $139.99 (GE Power Pro X500 White) up to $499.95 (Fujifilm FinePix HS20EXR), whereas Nikon Coolpix P500 is $399.00, Canon PowerShot SX30 IS was $379.00 and Fujifilm HS10 $354.52. So, the highest price was more than 3.5x the cheapest price.

X550 
In 2012, GE Power Pro X550 was introduced with Manufacturer's Suggested Retail Price (MSRP) $149.99 as a minor improvement on the GE Power Pro X500 with added advanced object tracking capabilities to automatically focus on moving objects.

X600 
GE Power Pro X600 with MSRP of $199.99 when announced in 2012 has a 14.4 MP CMOS sensor, 26× optical zoom (26–676 mm), capable of capturing Full HD 1080p video recording. According to PC Magazine, the camera is suitable for who have a little cash, but has sharp lens, affordable zoom, an EVF, and uses a lithium battery. The photo and video quality is not the best, but can give a good photo in low ISO, and in 800 ISO has noise lower than 1.5 percent and use Imatest give 1,842 lines per picture height or more than 1,800 lines as a sharp quality photo. The camera has many physical controls, but has no Aperture priority mode (has PSM mode). Relatively slow when start and need 0.1–0.15 seconds of shutter response, but can take 7fps continuous shooting for 150 images without slowdown using SD card with transfer rate at least 95 MB/second. The body shape of the camera is similar with Panasonic Lumix FZ200 with deep handgrip, big lens, and eye-level EVF, but more compact with only 12.5 ounces (350 grams) weight. The camera can also take Pancapture panorama photo, six multi successive exposures in one frame, and has 6× digital zoom, but no RAW, no stereo sound and no hotshoe. The shutter speeds longest is also only four seconds.

X2600 
GE Power Pro X2600 with MSRP 169.99 has optical zoom 26x as GE Power Pro X600, but use 16MP CCD sensor, bigger and heavier without EVF. Imatest give 2,308 lines per picture height or better than GE Power Pro X600, but all other performances are worse than the sibling. PC Magazine suggests to choose the GE Power Pro X600 due to only a slightly higher price.

See also 
 Digital photography

References

External links 
GE Digital Cameras

Digital cameras
Digital photography
General Electric
Manufacturing companies based in Greater Los Angeles
Companies based in Torrance, California
Manufacturing companies established in 2007
2007 establishments in California